Warner Music Poland Sp. z o.o., is a Polish subsidiary of Warner Music Group, it was founded in 1994 in Warsaw. The label's CEO is Piotr Kabaj.

The label started with a catalog of Polish national record label Polton which was bought from Starstream Communications Group by Warner Music Group.

In 2014 Warner Music Poland was merged with Parlophone Music Poland Sp. z o.o., after Parlophone Records, Ltd. was sold by Universal Music Group to Warner Music Group

Warner Music Poland catalogue includes also EMI Music Poland releases before it was renamed in 2013 to Parlophone. That include rights for titles by such artists as Blue Café, T.Love, Voo Voo, Wojciech Waglewski, Wilki and Pati Yang among others.

WMP distributes in Poland releases by such labels as Warner Classics, Nuclear Blast and Roadrunner Records among others.

WMP acquired Polskie Nagrania Muza, Poland's oldest record label, in May 2015.

Artists

Current

 Ruth Koleva
 Afromental
 Nevena Paykova
 Agnieszka Chylińska
 Stan Noir
 Elektryczne Gitary
 Fair Weather Friends
 Gang
 Maciej Maleńczuk
 Kasia Stankiewicz
 Katarzyna Groniec
 Les Ki
 LemON
 L.U.C
 Łzy
 Maja Koman
 Mela Koteluk
 Megitza
 Mikromusic
 Natalia Przybysz
 OCN
 Przemysław Budny
 Stan Borys
 T.Love
 Tatiana Okupnik
 The Dumplings
 Uniqplan
 Xxanaxx
 Warszawskie Combo Taneczne
 Zygmunt Staszczyk

Former

 Anna Maria Jopek & Pat Metheny
 Anna Szarmach
 Blenders
 Dezerter
 Hey
 Koli
 Kilersi
 Małgorzata Ostrowska
 Mistic
 Medusa
 Negatyw
 Onar & O$ka
 Oxy.Gen
 Papa Dance
 Püdelsi
 Sistars (disbanded)
 TSA
 WSZ & CNE

See also
 BMG Poland
 PolyGram Poland
 Sony Music Entertainment Poland
 Sony BMG Music Entertainment Poland
 Universal Music Poland

References

External links
 Official website

Warner Music labels
Polish record labels